A batteryless radio is a radio receiver which does not require the use of a battery to provide it with electrical power.

Originally this referred to units which could be used directly by AC mains supply (mains radio); it can also refer to units which do not require a power source at all, except for the power that they receive from radio waves.

History 

The line-operated vacuum tube receiver was invented in 1925 by Edward S. Rogers, Sr. The unit operated with 5 Rogers AC vacuum tubes and the Rogers Battery-Eliminator Power Unit (power supply). This unit was later marketed for $120  as "Type 120". He established the Toronto station CFRB (an abbreviation of Canada's First Rogers Batteryless) to promote sales of the product. Batteryless radios were not introduced into the United States until May 1926 and then into Europe in 1927.

Crystal radio receivers are a very simple kind of batteryless radio receiver. They do not need a battery or power source, except for the power that they receive from radio waves using their long outdoor wire antenna.

Thermoelectricity was widely used in the remote parts of the Soviet Union from the 1920s to power radios.  The equipment comprised some bi-metal rods (thermocouples), one end of which could be inserted into the fireplace to get hot with the other end left out in the cold.

After the Second World War, kerosene radios were made in Moscow for use in rural areas. These all-wave radios were powered by the kerosene lamp hanging above them. The temperature differential generated enough current to operate the low-drain receiver.

Foot-operated radio or pedal radio was once used in Australia. Other ways of achieving the same function are clockwork radio, hand crank radio and solar radio, especially for the Royal Flying Doctor Service and School of the Air.

Carrier-powered radio 

A carrier-powered radio is a batteryless radio which "leeches" its power from the incoming electromagnetic wave. A simple circuit (very similar to a crystal set) rectifies the incoming signal and this DC current is then used to power a small transistor amplifier. Typically a strong local station is tuned in to provide power, leaving the listener free to listen to weaker and more distant stations.

See also 

 Antique radio
 Battery eliminator
 Crystal radio
 Human-powered equipment
 Invention of radio
 Pyroelectric effect
 Radio receiver
 Solar powered radio
 Thermogenerator
 Windup radio
 Wireless light switch
 Ambient backscatter
 RFID

References

External links 
 Museum of thermoelectric generators

Thermodynamics
Electricity
Types of radios